Sogna ragazzo sogna is an album by Italian singer-songwriter Roberto Vecchioni.

Track listing
"Sogna ragazzo sogna"
"Vorrei essere tua madre"
"Vedrai"
"Canzone per Alda Merini"
"I commedianti"
"Alamo"
"Incubi ricorrenti del sognatore Olsen"
"Ho sognato di vivere"
"Ritratto di signora in raso rosa"
"Il più grande spettacolo del mondo"

1999 albums
Roberto Vecchioni albums